La Hune Bay is natural bay on the island of Newfoundland in the province of Newfoundland and Labrador, Canada. It is by Cape La Hune.

References

Bays of Newfoundland and Labrador